Area codes 0-99 serve the three largest cities in Mexico. The country code of Mexico is +52.

Area code 33 serves the Metropolitan area of Guadalajara, Jalisco, area code 55 and area code 56 serve the Metropolitan area of Mexico City (Mexico State and the CDMX) and area code 81 serves the Metropolitan area of Monterrey, Nuevo León.

(For other areas, see Area codes in Mexico by code).

0